Big Timber is a 1924 American silent  drama film directed by George Melford and starring William Desmond, Olive Hasbrouck and Betty Francisco. It is adapted from a 1913 novel The Heart of the Night Wind  by Vingie E. Roe. It is not a remake of the 1917 film of the same title, itself based on a novel by Bertrand William Sinclair.

Cast
 William Desmond as Walter Sandry
 Olive Hasbrouck as Sally O'Hara
 Betty Francisco as Poppy Ordway
 Ivor McFadden as John Daly
 Lydia Yeamans Titus as Ma Daly
 Albert J. Smith as Fred Hampden

References

Bibliography
 Goble, Alan. The Complete Index to Literary Sources in Film. Walter de Gruyter, 1999.
 Connelly, Robert B. The Silents: Silent Feature Films, 1910-36, Volume 40, Issue 2. December Press, 1998.
 Munden, Kenneth White. The American Film Institute Catalog of Motion Pictures Produced in the United States, Part 1. University of California Press, 1997.

External links
 

1924 films
1924 drama films
American silent feature films
Silent American drama films
Films directed by George Melford
American black-and-white films
Universal Pictures films
Films based on American novels
1920s American films